Jane Denton, (born 30 June 1953) is a United Kingdom nurse and midwife notable for her contributions to fertility nursing and genetics. She was made a Fellow of the Royal College of Nursing in 2006.

Early life
She attended the Nottingham Bluecoat Grammar School (now the Nottingham Bluecoat Academy).

Career
She was a contributor to the development of the UK’s first IVF programme. She served as nursing director of the Hallam Medical Centre, and was a founder member of the RCN Fertility Nurse Group that lobbied for the development of the current Human Fertilisation and Embryology Authority (HFEA) Act.

In 1992 she was named the first nurse appointed to the HFEA, which regulates and inspects all UK clinics providing IVF, donor insemination or the storage of eggs, sperm or embryos.

In her current role as Director of the Multiple Births Foundation, she has contributed to significant change in public and professional perception and attitudes towards multiple births.

Honours
She was appointed a CBE in the Queen's Birthday Honours List in June 2007 for services to health care.

References

English nurses
British nursing administrators
British midwives
Commanders of the Order of the British Empire
1953 births
Fellows of the Royal College of Nursing
People educated at Nottingham Bluecoat Academy
People from Nottingham
Living people
British nurses